Södertörn Wing, also F 18 Tullinge, or simply F 18, is a former Swedish Air Force wing with the main base located in Tullinge just south-west of the capital Stockholm on the east coast.

Heraldry and traditions

Coat of arms
Blazon: "Per bend sinister or and gules a griffon segreant sable, armed azure, in both foreclutches an orb or".

Colours, standards and guidons
The colour of the wing is preserved at the Swedish Army Museum. Blazon: "On blue cloth in the centre the badge of the Air Force; a winged two-bladed propeller under a royal crown proper. In the first corner a griffon segreant armed, holding an orb, all or".

Commanding officers
The commanding officer was referred to as "wing commander" and had the rank of colonel.

1946–1949: Björn Lindskog
1949–1963: Erik Raab
1963–1966: Dick Stenberg
1966–1974: Sven Alm

Names, designations and locations

See also
 Swedish Air Force
 List of military aircraft of Sweden

References

Notes

Print

Web

Further reading

Wings of the Swedish Air Force
Military units and formations established in 1946
Military units and formations disestablished in 1974
1946 establishments in Sweden
1974 disestablishments in Sweden
Stockholm Garrison
Disbanded units and formations of Sweden